Coulter Arthur Anthony Osborne Q.C. (born 29 April 1934) is a Canadian arbitrator and former Associate Chief Justice of Ontario. He was appointed to the Ontario Court of Appeal in 1990 and became Associate Chief Justice in 1999. In 2001 he was appointed Ontario's Integrity Commissioner and also served as Ontario's Lobby Registrar until 2007.

He graduated from Osgoode Hall Law School in 1959.

Prior to his career in law, he represented Canada at the 1956 Summer Olympics in basketball.

References

1934 births
Living people
Arbitrators
Judges in Ontario
Osgoode Hall Law School alumni
Canadian men's basketball players
Olympic basketball players of Canada
Basketball players at the 1956 Summer Olympics
Western Mustangs basketball players